Seeley Farmhouse, also known as Little Richard's Tavern, is a historic home located at Glenville in Schenectady County, New York. The L-shaped building consists of two main blocks.  The front block took its present form about 1850 and is in an atypical Greek Revival style.  It consists of a 2-story central pedimented pavilion with flanking -story wings.

It was added to the National Register of Historic Places in 1978.

References

Houses on the National Register of Historic Places in New York (state)
Greek Revival houses in New York (state)
Houses completed in 1850
Houses in Schenectady County, New York
National Register of Historic Places in Schenectady County, New York